Kaitlin Janette Doubleday (born July 19, 1984) is an American actress. She played a number of supporting film roles in her early career, including in Waiting... (2005) and Accepted (2006). From 2015 to 2016, she starred as Rhonda Lyon in the Fox musical prime time soap opera Empire. In 2017, Doubleday joined the cast of CMT musical drama series Nashville, playing Jessie Caine. In 2019, she appeared as the lead in Christmas at Graceland: Home for the Holidays.

Early life
Doubleday, who was born and raised in Los Angeles, is the elder of two daughters raised by Frank Doubleday and Christina Hart. She grew up in a show business family: her parents are former professional actors, and her younger sister, Portia, is an actress as well. Her mother works in the entertainment industry as a playwright and also as a producer in the theater. She attended the Music Academy at Hamilton High School in Los Angeles.

Career
Doubleday made her acting debut in an episode of the CBS procedural Without a Trace in 2002 and in the same year appeared in the feature film Catch Me If You Can. She graduated to supporting roles in films Waiting... (2005), The TV Set (2006) and Accepted (2006). In 2007, she starred in the ABC comedy series, Cavemen. The series received negative reviews and was canceled after a month on the air. In the following years, Doubleday continued performing on television, with small parts on CSI: Miami, Brothers & Sisters, Bones, The Closer, Criminal Minds, Drop Dead Diva and Witches of East End. Doubleday also performed in the recurring role of Logan Louis in the HBO comedy series Hung in 2011.

In 2015, Doubleday began starring in the Fox musical prime time soap opera Empire. She played Rhonda Lyon, wife of the eldest son in the Lyon family. Also in 2015, she was cast in the independent drama film Po directed by John Asher, about a single father raising a son with autism. Doubleday also appeared as a celebrity guest on The CW improvisational comedy show Whose Line Is It Anyway in June 2016. In 2017, she featured in the popular horror series Scary Endings alongside Australian actor Adam J. Yeend in an episode titled "The Water Rises".

In 2017, Doubleday joined the cast of CMT musical drama series Nashville in its fifth season, following the departure of original series star Connie Britton. She portrayed Jessie Caine, a singer/songwriter. Her character was introduced during the series' 100th episode on June 15, 2017.

In 2019, Doubleday played the female lead in Christmas at Graceland: Home for the Holidays. Doubleday's character plans a successful Elvis-themed Christmas exhibit amidst a larger fundraiser on the grounds of Graceland. The performance drew on Doubleday's acting and singing abilities.

Personal life
In May 2015, Doubleday became engaged to Devin Lucien, a DJ, in Paris. She and Lucien married on May 6, 2016 in Big Sur. The couple has a son, born in 2019.

Filmography

Film

Television

References

External links
 

1984 births
Living people
Actresses from Los Angeles
Alexander Hamilton High School (Los Angeles) alumni
American television actresses
American film actresses
21st-century American actresses
American soap opera actresses